Baburaj Jacob, mononymously known as Baburaj, is an Indian actor, director, and screenwriter who works predominantly in Malayalam cinema and has also appeared in Tamil, Telugu, and Hindi films. He began and established his career in cinema by playing antagonistic roles and graduated to comedic and character roles after the 2011 film Salt N' Pepper.

Personal life
Baburaj was born to P. J. Jacob Oleekkal and T. I. Karmali Thottungal on 5 March 1970. Baburaj married twice. He has two sons from his first marriage named Abhay and Akshay. His second marriage is to South Indian action heroine Vani Viswanath. The couple has two children, a daughter named Aarcha and a son named Adhri. Baburaj is a lawyer. They reside at Kochi. On 14 Feb 2017, Baburaj was stabbed by one of his neighbours in Idukki following an argument.

Film career 
Baburaj started his acting career as a junior artist. His debut in Malayalam was Beeshmacharyar (1994), directed by Cochin Haneefa, where he played a notorious villain. He also acted as a villain in the Hindi movie, Hulchul, which was a remake of the Malayalam blockbuster, Godfather. He produced four Malayalam movies and one Tamil movie.

In 2009, he debuted as a director in the Malayalam movie Black Dalia, starring Himself and Suresh Gopi in lead. He also directed the movie Manushyamrugam, starring Himself and Prithviraj Sukumaran in lead. His wife produced the movie.

In 2011, he did a comedy role in Salt N' Pepper, directed by Aashiq Abu.  With this comedy role in Salt N' Pepper, he became one of the busiest actors in Malayalam cinema. He did one of the lead role in the crime thriller Manushyamrugam after the success of Salt N' Pepper. He did comedy roles in films such as Ordinary and Mayamohini. Apart from this, he was a lead actor in films such as Naughty Professor and DYSP Sankunni Uncle. Baburaj did a lead role in the 2017 comedy movie Honey Bee 2: Celebrations followed by Thrissivaperoor Kliptham, where he did the antagonist role. Baburaj's true potential to do the character roles was revealed with the film Koodasha. In this suspense revenge thriller film, he played the role of a father who seeks revenge against the persons killed his daughter. Baburaj's performance as Panakkal Jomon in the crime drama Joji (2021) was highly appreciated by the critics.

In 2021, he directed the comedy movie Black Coffee, which is a spin-off to Salt N' Pepper.

Awards and nominations

Filmography

As actor

Veerame Vaagai Soodum
Kooman(film)Marakkar: Arabikadalinte Simham as Puthumana Panicker Power Star (2021 film) Joji (film)  (2021) as Panachel Jomon
 Black Coffee(2021)
Vikruthi (2019)
My Great Grandfather (2019)
Koodasha (2018) as Lead role
Neeli (2018)
Sketch (2018)
Kaly (2018)
Thrissivaperoor Kliptham (2017) as Joy Chembadan
Honey Bee 2.5 (2017) as Himself (cameo)
Honey Bee 2: Celebrations (2017) as Fernandez d'Silva aka Ferno
Wonderful Journey (2016)
Poyi Maranju Parayathe (2016)
8 March (2015)
Mylanchi Monchulla Veedu (2014)
 Tamaar Padaar(2014) as Jumper Thambi and Terrorist (Dual role)
 Peruchazhi (2014)
 Ulsaha Committee (2014) as Chopra
 Sringaravelan (2013) as Mahalingam
 Blackberry (2013)
 Pigman (2013) as GM Veera Swamy 
 Ithu Manthramo Thanthramo Kuthanthramo (2013) as S. S. Nair
 Policemamman  (2013) as Sankaranunni
 Honey Bee (2013)
 Kammath & Kammath (2013) as Driver Gopi
 Entry (2013) as ACP Rishikesh
 Idiots (2012) as Freddy
 Mr. Marumakan (2012) as Advocate K.V. Panikkar
 Jawan of Vellimala (2012)
 Cinema Company (2012) as Sabu, a movie-loving thug
 Naughty Professor (2012) as Professor Viswambaran
 Mayamohini (2012) as Advocate Laksmi Narayanan
 Ordinary (2012) as Vakkachan
 Thalsamayam Oru Penkutty (2012) as Thomas
  Vaidooryam (2012)
 Second Show (2012) as Chaver Anthony & Chaver Vavachan
 Asuravithu (2012)
 Manushyamrugam (2011) as Tipper Johnny
 Salt N' Pepper (2011) as Babu Raj
 Pokkiri Raja (2010)
 Thanthonni (2010) as Ummachan
 Pramani (2010)
 Daddy Cool (2009) as Soman
 Black Dalia (2009) as CI Anwar Ali
 My Big Father (2009) as Chacko
 Twenty:20 (2008) as Nazar
 Aayudham (2008 film) as C. I. Rappayi
 Nasrani (2007) as Sayed
 Indrajith (2007) as Hamid
 Nagaram (2007) as Lawrence
 Nadiya Kollappetta Rathri (2007) as Lakkidi Manikantan
 Sooryan (2007) as Kattiparaban
 Mission 90 Days (2007) as Major Deepak
 Athisayan (2007) 
 Time (2007 film) as Damodharan Kartha
 Chotta Mumbai (2007)
 Pranayakalam (2007)
 Avan Chandiyude Makan (2007) as Sonychan
 Abraham & Lincoln (2007) as Ameen 
 Ali Bhai as Koya
 Black Cat (2007) 
 Pothan Vava (2006)
 The Don (2006) as Abdu
 Chess (2006) as Sarath
 Chinthamani Kolacase (2006) as Isra Qureshi
 Thuruppu Gulan (2006)
 Chacko Randaaman (2006) as Karibadam Kannan
 Kilukkam Kilukilukkam (2006) as Vishnu
 Mahasamudram (2006) as Rajan
 Ravanan(2006) as Jamal
 Prajapathi (2006)
 Bada Dosth (2006) 
 Highway Police (2006) as Vikram
 Rajamanikyam (2005) as Vikraman
 Nerariyan CBI(2005) as Poopparathy Vasu
 Lokanathan I.A.S (2005) as Unnithan
 Rappakal (2005) as Manikantan
 Thaskaraveeran (2005)
 Isra (2005) as Bhadran
 Athbhutha Dweepu (2005) as Captain Mohammad
 Amrutham (2004)
 Sathyam (2004) as Mattancherry Michael
 Kusruthi (2004) as Ramabhadran
 Kaliyodam (2003)
 Chakram (2003) as Sudhakaran
 Kilichundan Mampazham (2003) as Hamsa
 Vaalkkannadi (2002) 
 Chathurangam (2002)
 Shivam (2002) as Ashokan
 Onnaman (2002)
 Kuberan (2002)
 Jagathi Jagadish in Town (2002) as Rajaji
 Stop Vilonce (2002)
 Praja (2001)
 Sraavu(2001) as Shivan
 Nariman (2001) as Ajayan
 Red Indians (film) (2001) as Jumbo Sankar
 Raavanaprabhu (2001) as Natesan
 Naranathu Thamburan (2001)
 Randam Bhavam (2001) as Shetty
 Dhosth (2001)
 Saivar Tirumeni(2000)
 Rapid Action Force (2000) as Alex Fernandez/Kargil Ghouse
 Sathyameva Jayathe(2000)
 Mera Naam Joker(2000) as Rajasekharan
 The Gang (2000)
 Chandamama (1999)
 Harikrishnans(1998)
 Oru Maravathoor Kanavu (1998) as Devassy
 Ormacheppu (1998) as Police Officer
 Adukala Rahasyavum Angadi Pattum (1997)
 Ranger (film) (1997) as Baburaj
 Vamsham (1997) as Police Officer
 Shibiram (1997)
 Gajarajamanthram (1997)
 Kottapurathe Koottukudumbam (1997) as Antony
 Swarna Kireedam (1996)
 Kudamattam (1996)
 Dilli wallah Rajakumaran (1996)
 Swapna Lokathe Balabhaskaran (1996)
 Padanayakan (1996)
 Kanjirapally Kariachan (1996)
 KL 95 Ernakulam North (1996) as A.Z.Stanley
 Mimics Super 1000 (1996) 
 Naalaamkettile Nalla Thampimaar (1996)
 Mantrika kuthira (1996)
 Ishtamanu nooruvattam (1996)
 Thirumanassu (1995) as Albert Pereira
 Three Men Army (1995)
 Ezharakoottam (1995)
 Mazhavilkoodaram (1995) as College Gunda
 Special Squad (1995)
 Peter Scott (film) (1995) as Gunda
 Arabikadaloram  (1995) as Shaji 
 Street (1995) as Gunda
 Mimics Action 500 (1994) as Ramesh Thamban
 Kamboolam (1994)
 The Porter (1994) as Karimpattakaran Kochekkan
 Beeshmacharyara (1994)

Telugu movies
 Anthima Theerpu (2010)

Kannada movies
 Daali (2019)

Tamil movies
Jaya (2002)
Parasuram (2003)
Jana (2004)
Sketch (2018)
Veeramae Vaagai Soodum (2022)

Hindi movies
 Hulchul (2004)

As director
 Black Coffee (2021)
 Manushyamrugam (2011)
 Black Dalia (2009)
 Police Maman (2016)

As producer
Gajarajamathram  (1997)
Adukkala Rahasyam Angaadippaattu (1997)
Kulirkaattu (1998)
 The Gang (2000)
 Thantra (2006)

Story
 Adukkala Rahasyam Angadipattu-(1997)
 The Gang (2000)
 Black Dalia (2009)
 Manushyamrigam (2011)
 Naughty Professor (2012)

Screenplay and dialogue
 The Gang (2000)
 Black Dalia (2009)
 Manushyamrigam (2011)
 Naughty Professor (2012)

Lyrics
 Jig Jinga as Naughty Professor (2012)
 Thalam Thiruthalam as Naughty Professor	(2012)

Playback singing
Maamaa Maamaa as Police Maman	(2013)

Television
Comedy stars season 2 (Asianet) as Judge
Lunars Comedy Express (Asianet Plus) as Judge
Kadamattathu Kathanar (Asianet)
kudipaka-(Asianet)

References

External links
 

Living people
21st-century Indian male actors
Male actors in Hindi cinema
Male actors from Kochi
Male actors in Telugu cinema
Indian male film actors
Male actors in Malayalam cinema
Malayalam film directors
Film directors from Kerala
Malayalam film producers
Film producers from Kochi
Screenwriters from Kochi
21st-century Indian dramatists and playwrights
21st-century Indian film directors
People from Aluva
1970 births
21st-century Indian screenwriters